A statue of Jerry Coleman was installed at San Diego's Petco Park, in the U.S. state of California, in 2012.

References

External links
 Jerry Coleman Statue Unveiled at Petco Park - San Diego, CA at Waymarking

2012 establishments in California
2012 sculptures
Bronze sculptures in California
Monuments and memorials in California
Outdoor sculptures in San Diego
Sculptures of men in California
Statues in California